Oliver Sonne (born 10 November 2000) is a Danish professional footballer who plays as a right-back for Danish Superliga club Silkeborg IF. Born in Denmark, Sonne's maternal grandmother is Peruvian.

Club career
Sonne started playing football at the age of Ejby IF Fodbold, and later also played for Rishøj IF and HB Køge. After being spotted by scouts on the app Tonsser, he was invited to club trials with Marseille and FC Copenhagen. The French club wanted to see ham again, but Sonne decided to stay in Denmark and signed a 18-month contract with FC Copenhagen in February 2018, where he played for the U19 and reserve teams.

In June 2019, Sonne returned to HB Køge, where he signed a two-year professional deal with his former club. Sonne played in Køge for two years, where he made a total of 34 appearances.

On 11 May 2021, Sonne was sold to newly promoted Danish Superliga team Silkeborg IF, signing a two-year deal. Sonne made his official debut on 29 August 2021 against Randers FC in the Danish Superliga. In December 2021, Sonne signed a contract extension until June 2026.

Sonne scored his first professional goal on 18 September 2022, scoring after being assisted by Kasper Kusk.

Career statistics

Personal life
Sonne is the nephew of the Danish supermodel and photographer Helena Christensen. Beside football, Sonne also worked as a fashion model, like his aunt.

References

External links

2000 births
Living people
Danish men's footballers
Danish male models
Association football defenders
Danish 1st Division players
Danish Superliga players
HB Køge players
F.C. Copenhagen players
Silkeborg IF players
Danish people of Peruvian descent